Katayoun (Kathy) Rose (born Katayoun Azarmi) is an Iranian-American jewelry designer, actress, and entrepreneur.

Biography
Kathy Rose was born in Tehran, Iran and has lived in Los Angeles since 1978.

Career 
She created the jewelry line Kaviar Jewelry in 2002, now called Kathy Rose Jewelry.

Rose opened a retail boutique, Kaviar and Kind in 2003, now called Roseark with jewelry and clothes. It is featuring her line, as well as lines from other designers. Photographs and paintings are also exhibited in the boutique. In 2009 she opened a second boutique in Santa Monica.

She won the first season of the Bravo show, Launch My Line in 2010.

In addition to her jewelry endeavors, she is an actress, appearing in Pranksters (2005), Hollywood (2006), and Out At The Wedding (2007), Inja Shahreh Man Bood (2012)  as well as acting as producer on both Hollywood and Pranksters.

Awards/Recognition
Rose was a Fashion Group International Rising Star Finalist in Jewelry in 2004.

In 2007, she was selected to exhibit her Grasshopper Cuff at the California Design Biennial at the Pasadena Museum of California Art.

In 2010, she won the Bravo series Launch My Line with fashion expert Emil Gampe.

References

External links
 Time (magazine)
 http://www.lookbooknyc.com/2008/10/kaviar-and-kind.html
 https://web.archive.org/web/20090821061108/http://www.bravotv.com/launch-my-line/bio/kathy-rose
 https://www.imdb.com/name/nm1125194/
 https://archive.today/20140313151829/http://roseark.com/kathy-rose.php
 Time Magazine Style and Design Issue
 WWD article on Kathy Rose Jewelry
 Article on Kathy Rose Jewelry

1972 births
Living people
American film actresses
American jewelry designers
American businesspeople in retailing
Iranian emigrants to the United States
People from Tehran
Participants in American reality television series
21st-century American businesspeople
21st-century American women
Women jewellers